Kokino is the name of several rural localities in Russia:
Kokino, Komarichsky District, Bryansk Oblast, a village in Komarichsky District of Bryansk Oblast
Kokino, Vygonichsky District, Bryansk Oblast, a selo in Vygonichsky District of Bryansk Oblast
Kokino, Kirov Oblast, a village in Yuryansky District of Kirov Oblast
Kokino, Moscow Oblast, a village in Kashirsky District of Moscow Oblast